Ivan Milenković, (born 3 July 1983) is a Serbian footballer who plays for FK Sinđelić Niš in the Serbian League East.

Born in Niš, he started in Radnički Niš and played 145 games for the club. In 2007, he moved to FK Jagodina but played only 15 games in two seasons. In 2008, he went to FK Mladi Radnik for a half season. In 2010, he moved to Radnički Niš and had three good seasons. In summer 2013 he moved to FK Sinđelić Niš.

Honours
 Serbian First League
 Winner (1): 2012

References

1983 births
Living people
Sportspeople from Niš
Serbian footballers
FK Jagodina players
Serbian SuperLiga players
Association football midfielders
FK Mladi Radnik players
FK Sinđelić Niš players